Sioux Falls New Technology High School is a high school in Sioux Falls, South Dakota.

References

External links
School website
Sioux Falls School District

Educational institutions established in 2010
Public high schools in South Dakota
Schools in Minnehaha County, South Dakota
2010 establishments in South Dakota